LJ Volley, known as Liu Jo Modena, was an Italian women's volleyball club based in Modena. It played in the Serie A1 from its creation in 2013 until its dissolution in 2016.

History
The club was established when fashion company Liu·Jo decided to create a volleyball club based in Modena and in May 2013, the company acquired a Serie A1 licence from Gruppo Sportivo Oratorio Villa Cortese. The club was officially unveiled in Carpi (Modena) on 28 May 2013 under the name . The project goal was to bring women's volleyball back to Modena, which has a long tradition in the sport, by creating a professional club and supporting a local club focussed on youth teams.

After the club's third season, in May 2016, an agreement between the club and Nordmeccanica Piacenza was announced, following LJ Volley decision to ceased its volleyball operations. In the agreement River Volley acquired LJ Volley assets (players and rights to play at the PalaPanini) with Liu Jo becoming River's main sponsor and the club based in Piacenza was renamed  with home matches played at the PalaPanini in Modena. LJ Volley sold its Serie A1 licence to Neruda Volley.

Team
The club's last team, season 2015–2016.

References

Italian women's volleyball clubs
Volleyball clubs established in 2013
2013 establishments in Italy
Defunct sports teams in Italy
Sports clubs disestablished in 2016
2016 disestablishments in Italy
Modena
Sport in Emilia-Romagna
Serie A1 (women's volleyball) clubs